Skiplagged.com is an online travel agency and metasearch engine  for booking flights and hotels. It popularized the tactic of hidden city ticketing.

History
The website was started by Aktarer Zaman in 2013, when he was 20 years old.

In November 2014, it was sued by United Airlines and Orbitz, claiming that the website violated fare rules. The lawsuit was thrown out by the courts.

See also 
 Expedia
 Trivago
 	
 Webjet

References

American travel websites
Internet properties established in 2013
Metasearch engines
Online travel agencies
Travel ticket search engines